Aleksandr Kharlanov is a Russian swimmer. He won the gold medal in 200 metres butterfly at the 2017 European Short Course Swimming Championships.

References

1995 births
Living people
Russian male swimmers
Medalists at the FINA World Swimming Championships (25 m)
Male butterfly swimmers
Male medley swimmers